The 1972 Gael Linn Cup, the most important representative competition for elite level participants in the women's team field sport of camogie, was won by Leinster, who defeated Connacht in the final, played at Markievicz Park.

Arrangements
Two goals from Anne Sheehy and one each from Elsie Walsh and Orla Ni Siochain helped Leinster defeat a Munster team that had 11 Cork players fresh from their All-Ireland triumph by 4–2 to 1–0 at St Finbarr's. Connacht selected the 12 Galway players who won the All-Ireland junior title to defeat Ulster 6–6 to 5–5 in Sligo. Two goals each from Maura Cassin and Anne Sheehy and one each from Orla Ni Siochain, Ann Crroll and Elsie Walsh helped Leinster win the final by 7–7 to 4–2. Agnes Hourigan wrote in the Irish Press: Great credit is due to the players of both teams for their display in a match which was played in a downpour and driving cross wind.

Final stages

|}

References

External links
 Camogie Association

1972 in camogie
1972